Der Fackelträger is an East German black and white film directed by Johannes Knittel. It was released in 1957.

Cast
 Hermann Kiessner as Dr. Sänger
 Loni Michelis as Frau Sänger
 Friedrich Gnaß as Kabische
 Harry Hindemith as Dr. Hartmann
 Horst Kube as Johannes
 Ruth Maria Kubitschek as Dora
 Georg Thies as Gottfried
 Margret Homeyer as Ingeborg
 Norbert Christian as Assessor Großkopf
 Charlotte Brummerhoff as Bittrich
 Horst Schönemann as Dr. Schleitz
 Wolf von Beneckendorff as Prosecutor General
 Hans W. Hamacher as Senator
 Annemarie Hase as Ziebusch

External links
 

1957 films
East German films
1950s German-language films
German black-and-white films
1950s German films